The Sulphur Channel is a narrow inshore passage between Green Island and the northwest tip of Hong Kong Island in Hong Kong. The Sulphur Channel is mainly used by small craft and inter-island ferries passing between Victoria Harbour and the East Lamma Channel.

The channel was named after HMS Sulphur, a bomb vessel commanded by Edward Belcher who took the first British survey to Hong Kong harbour on 25 January 1841. Captain Belcher left HMS Sulphur with a landing party on 26 January 1841, disembarked on the northern foreshore, and raised the Union Jack over Hong Kong at Possession Point (what is today Hollywood Road Park). After raising a toast to the Queen with his companions, he officially declared the island the property of Her Majesty Queen Victoria and a Colony of the British Empire.

In the 1990s, the Hong Kong Government had planned to reclaim the channel but withdrew later due to opposition from environmental concern groups.

See also

List of channels in Hong Kong

References 

Channels of Hong Kong